Maxime Potty (born 26 November 1999) is a Belgian racing driver currently competing in the TCR International Series and TCR Benelux Touring Car Championship. Having previously competed in several karting championships.

Racing career
Potty began his career in 2010 in karting. He took several good results in many different karting championships. In 2012 he won the Belgian X30 Junior karting title. In 2013 he won the CIK-FIA Karting Academy Trophy title. In 2016 he made the switch to the TCR Benelux Touring Car Championship, he finished the season sixth in the standings after one victory and six podiums. Potty had several different teammates throughout the season, with Ronnie Latinne taking one podium, Stefano Comini taking two victories and Loris Hezemans and Grégoire Demoustier not taking any podiums. He continued in the series again in 2017.

In May 2017 it was announced that he would race in the TCR International Series, driving a Volkswagen Golf GTI TCR for Michaël Mazuin Sport.

Racing record

Career summary

Complete TCR International Series results
(key) (Races in bold indicate pole position) (Races in italics indicate fastest lap)

Complete TCR Europe Touring Car Series results
(key) (Races in bold indicate pole position) (Races in italics indicate fastest lap)

References

External links
 
 

1999 births
People from Hamoir
Living people
TCR International Series drivers
Belgian racing drivers
Sportspeople from Liège Province
W Racing Team drivers
21st-century Belgian people
Comtoyou Racing drivers
TCR Europe Touring Car Series drivers